Gary H. Branae is a Democratic Party member of the Montana Senate. He has represented Senate District 27 for Billings, Montana since 2009. He was a member of the Montana House of Representatives, representing District 54 from 2000 to 2009.

External links
Montana House of Representatives - Gary Branae official MT State Legislature website
Project Vote Smart - Representative Gary H. Branae (MT) profile
Follow the Money - Gary Branae
2008 Montana Senate campaign contributions
2006 2004 2002 2000 Montana House campaign contributions

Democratic Party members of the Montana House of Representatives
Democratic Party Montana state senators
1944 births
Living people
Montana State University alumni
People from Big Timber, Montana